Falaniko "Niko" Noga (born March 1, 1962) is a former football linebacker who played eight seasons in the National Football League.

Brothers Pete and Al played at the University of Hawai'i and later in the NFL.

In popular culture
Niko and his brother Pete were briefly mentioned in an episode of Jon Bois' YouTube series, Pretty Good.

References

1962 births
Living people
Hawaii Rainbow Warriors football players
American football linebackers
St. Louis Cardinals (football) players
Phoenix Cardinals players
Detroit Lions players
Players of American football from Honolulu
American sportspeople of Samoan descent